Nor Kyank or Nor Kyank’ or Nor Kyanq may refer to:
Nor Kyank, Ararat, Armenia
Nor Kyank, Shirak, Armenia
Nor Kharberd, Armenia